Lieutenant, Were You Once a Hussar? is a 1930 German comedy film directed by Manfred Noa and starring Mady Christians, Gustav Diessl and Georg Alexander. It was made as a MLV with a separate French version My Heart Incognito being released the following year.

Cast
 Mady Christians as Königin Alexandra von Gregorien
 Gustav Diessl as Fedor Karew
 Georg Alexander as Prince Vicky
 Lotte Spira as Katharina Hofdame
 Gretl Theimer as Mimi
 Max Ehrlich as Ben Knox
 Hermann Picha as Der Wirt
 Max Ralph-Ostermann as Ministerpräsident
 Paul Rehkopf
 Bernd Aldor as Revolutionär
 Max Greiner as Revolutionär
 Hermann Blaß
 Dajos Bela as Violin player
 Fritz Greiner

References

Bibliography

External links 
 

1930 comedy films
German comedy films
1930 films
Films of the Weimar Republic
1930s German-language films
Films directed by Manfred Noa
German multilingual films
German black-and-white films
1930 multilingual films
1930s German films